OCRR can mean:

Old Colony Railroad in Massachusetts, USA (incorporated 1844)
earlier Old Colony Railroad (incorporated 1838), see New Bedford and Taunton Railroad, its name from 1839 to 1873
Oil Creek Railroad in Pennsylvania, USA
Ottawa Central Railway in Ontario and Quebec, Canada